Wiliete Sport Clube is an Angolan sports club from the city of Benguela, in the namesake province.

In 2019, the team qualified to the Gira Angola, the qualifying tournament for Angola's top division, the Girabola. They were promoted to the Girabola after Benfica do Lubango were excluded from the league.

League and cup positions

Managers
 João Pintar , Guilherme do Carmo c, Albano César (2020-21)
 Agostinho Tramagal (2019-20)
 Jorge Pinto Leite (2018-19)

Players and staff

Players

Staff

(c) = caretaker manager

External links
 Girabola.com profile
 Zerozero.pt profile
 Facebook profile

References

Football clubs in Angola
Sports clubs in Angola